Lembeh Strait is a strait in Indonesia, separating the islands of Sulawesi and Lembeh. The town of Bitung and Tongkoko volcano are located on the western side of the strait.

The strait is known for its abundant and colorful marine life, in particular sea slugs, and is a popular diving spot.

Bitung
Straits of Indonesia
Landforms of Sulawesi